Figulus incertus is a species of stag beetle (insects of the family Lucanidae).

Geographical distribution 
The species is found in New Guinea.  Originally recorded only from Redscar Bay, it was later also found approximately 780 km from there, in a sample of rotten Hevea brasiliensis wood from East Sepik Province.

References 

Lucaninae
Insects of New Guinea
Beetles described in 1987